Ann Mallalieu, Baroness Mallalieu,  (born 27 November 1945) is a British lawyer, Labour Party politician and president of the Countryside Alliance.

Family and early life
Lady Mallalieu comes from a distinguished political family. Her grandfather, Frederick Mallalieu, had been Liberal Member of Parliament for Colne Valley. He was succeeded in that seat by her uncle, Lance Mallalieu, later Labour MP for Brigg. Her father, Joseph Percival William Mallalieu (known as William), was Labour MP for Huddersfield East.
She was educated at Newnham College, Cambridge, where she was the first female president of the Cambridge Union Society.

Legal career
Mallalieu was a barrister in the chambers 6 Kings Bench Walk.

Political career
Mallalieu fought Hitchin for Labour at both the February and October 1974 elections, but was defeated by the Conservative Ian Stewart on both occasions.

House of Lords
On 19 June 1991, Mallalieu was made a life peer as Baroness Mallalieu, of Studdridge in the County of Buckinghamshire.

In 2004, she led the House of Lords opposition to the House of Commons' proposal to ban hunting with hounds.

In a House of Lords debate on the European Union (Withdrawal) Bill on 31 January 2018 Baroness Mallalieu revealed she had voted for Britain to leave the European Union in the 2016 referendum.

Personal life
Ann Mallalieu was married to Sir Timothy Cassel, Bt, QC. They have two daughters, born 1981 and 1984. The couple divorced in 2006.

Lady Mallalieu is a member of the Exmoor Hunt and the Devon and Somerset Staghounds.

Arms

References

External links

Profile on New Statesman

1945 births
Living people
Presidents of the Cambridge Union
Life peeresses created by Elizabeth II
Mallalieu, Ann Mallalieu, Baroness
Alumni of Newnham College, Cambridge
Fellows of Newnham College, Cambridge
Wives of baronets